Dmitry Sergeyevich Krivosheyev (born 19 September 1998) is a Belarusian professional footballer who plays for Slavia Mozyr.

References

External links 
 
 

1998 births
Living people
Belarusian footballers
Association football midfielders
FC Slavia Mozyr players
FC Lokomotiv Gomel players